North Potrock Run is a  long 1st order tributary to Cross Creek in Brooke County, West Virginia.  This is the only stream of this name in the United States.

Variant names
According to the Geographic Names Information System, it has also been known historically as:
Conns Run

Course
North Potrock Run rises about 1 mile southeast of  Mechling Hill, in Brooke County, West Virginia and then flows south-southwest to join Cross Creek about 1 mile east of Louise, West Virginia.

Watershed
North Potrock Run drains  of area, receives about 40.1 in/year of precipitation, has a wetness index of 313.90, and is about 78% forested.

See also
List of Rivers of West Virginia

References

Rivers of West Virginia
Rivers of Brooke County, West Virginia